is a 1983 Japanese film directed by Azuma Morisaki and based on a novel by Muramatsu Tomomi.

Awards and nominations
8th Hochi Film Award
 Won: Best Actress - Masako Natsume

References

External links

1983 films
Films based on Japanese novels
1980s Japanese-language films
Films directed by Azuma Morisaki
Films with screenplays by Haruhiko Arai
1980s Japanese films